is a passenger railway station in located in the city of Ise,  Mie Prefecture, Japan, operated by the private railway operator Kintetsu Railway.

Lines
Isuzugawa Station is served by the Toba Line, and is located 1.9 rail kilometers from the starting point of the line at Ujiyamada Station.

Station layout
The station was consists of two island platforms serving four tracks. The inner tracks (platforms 2 and 3) are for normal operations. The platforms are built on an embankment and connected to the station building by an underground passage.

Platforms

Adjacent stations

History
Isuzugawa Station was opened on December 15, 1969. The station has used PiTaPa automated wicket gates since April 1, 2007.

Passenger statistics
In fiscal 2019, the station was used by an average of 2026 passengers daily (boarding passengers only).

Surrounding area
Ise Grand Shrine
Ise General Hospital
Jusco
Kōgakkan University
Kōgakkan High School
Ise High School

See also
List of railway stations in Japan

References

External links

 Kintetsu: Isuzugawa Station

Railway stations in Japan opened in 1969
Railway stations in Mie Prefecture
Stations of Kintetsu Railway
Ise, Mie